Lance daffadar is the equivalent rank to corporal in Pakistan, Indian and British Indian Army cavalry units, ranking between acting lance daffadar and daffadar. In other units the equivalent is naik. Like a British corporal, a lance daffadar wears two rank chevrons.

Acting lance daffadar is the equivalent rank to lance corporal in Pakistan, Indian and British Indian Army cavalry units, ranking below lance daffadar. In other units the equivalent is lance naik. Like a British lance corporal, he wears a single rank chevron.

References

Military ranks of British India
Pakistan Army ranks
Military ranks of the Indian Army